The 2017–18 Welsh Football League Division One (known as the Nathaniel Cars Welsh Football League Division One for sponsorship reasons) was the 2017–18 season of the top football league in South Wales. Together with its North Wales counterpart, the Cymru Alliance, the 16-team division forms the second tier of the Welsh football league system, one level below the nationwide Welsh Premier League. The season began on 11 August 2017 and concluded in May 2018.

Teams

Barry Town United were champions in the previous season and were promoted to the 2017–18 Welsh Premier League.

The bottom two placed teams from the previous season, Risca United and Caldicot Town, were relegated to the 2017–18 Welsh Football League Division Two; they were replaced by Llanelli Town, Briton Ferry Llansawel and Cwmamman United, the top three teams from Division Two the previous season.

Stadia and locations

League table

Results

References

External links

2017–18 in Welsh football
Welsh Football League Division One seasons